Jejuri railway station is a station in the Pune district of Maharashtra, India. Its code is JJR. It serves Jejuri, a town known for the main temple of Lord Khandoba.

Details
The station consists of two platforms. This station connects Jejuri with major Indian cities such as Mumbai, Pune, Nagpur, Kolhapur, Goa through express trains. The station lies on the Pune–Miraj line of the Central Railways and is administered by the Pune railway division.

The station has facilities such as water and sanitation.

Trains serving the station
 Chhatrapati Shahu Maharaj Terminus–Gondia Maharashtra Express†
 Chhatrapati Shahu Maharaj Terminus–Chhatrapati Shivaji Terminus Koyna Express 
 Chhatrapati Shahu Maharaj Terminus–Chhatrapati Shivaji Terminus Sahyadri Express
 Pune–Satara Passenger
 Chhatrapati Shahu Maharaj Terminus–Pune Passenger

References

Railway stations in Pune
Pune railway division
Railway stations in Pune district